Van Buren Township is one of eleven townships in Monroe County, Indiana, United States. As of the 2010 census, its population was 11,981 and it contained 5,347 housing units.

History
Van Buren Township was established in 1837.

Geography

Cities, towns, villages
 Bloomington (west edge)

Unincorporated towns
 Elwren at 
 Garden Acres at 
 Highland Village at 
 Kirby at 
 Leonard Springs at 
 Stanford at 
(This list is based on USGS data and may include former settlements.)

Cemeteries
The township contains these two cemeteries: Harmony and Keller.

Major highways
  Indiana State Road 45

Airports and landing strips
 Monroe County Airport

School districts
 Monroe County Community School Corporation

Political districts
 Indiana's 4th congressional district
 State House District 60
 State Senate District 40

References
 
 United States Census Bureau 2008 TIGER/Line Shapefiles
 IndianaMap

External links
 City-Data.com page for Van Buren Township

Townships in Monroe County, Indiana
Bloomington metropolitan area, Indiana
Townships in Indiana